Yuri Aleksandrovich Okroshidze (born 23 August 1970) is a Russian professional football coach and a former player. He works as a goalkeepers coach for the reserve team of FC Zenit St. Petersburg.

Club career
He made his professional debut in the Soviet First League in 1990 for FC Zenit Leningrad.

Honours

Club
CSKA Moscow
 Russian Cup: runner-up 2000

Individual
 L'Alcúdia International Football Tournament Best Goalkeeper: 1988, 1989

References

1970 births
Living people
Soviet footballers
Russian footballers
Association football goalkeepers
Soviet First League players
FC Zenit Saint Petersburg players
Russian Premier League players
FC Rubin Kazan players
PFC CSKA Moscow players
FC Elista players
FC SKA Rostov-on-Don players
FC Sokol Saratov players